Zemplínska Nová Ves is a village and municipality in the Trebišov District in the Košice Region of south-eastern Slovakia. The village consist of parts: the first named Úpor and the second which name is Zemplinský Klečenov.

History
In historical records the village was first mentioned in 1263.

Geography
The village lies at an altitude of 129 metres and covers an area of 10.704 km².
It has a population of about 952 people.

Ethnicity
The village is about 98% Slovak

Facilities
The village has a public library and a football pitch.

External links
https://web.archive.org/web/20070513023228/http://www.statistics.sk/mosmis/eng/run.html

Villages and municipalities in Trebišov District